John W. Betrozoff (born c. 1935 in Raymond, Washington) was an American politician in the state of Washington. Before serving in the House he was a teacher, principal and central office administrator in the Bellevue School District, east of Seattle. He served in the Washington House of Representatives from 1983 to 1992 where he was the lead Republican on Education issues.  He served on the Legislative Ethics Committee after 1992 for five years.

References

External links 
 John Betrozoff at ourcampaigns.com

1930s births
Republican Party members of the Washington House of Representatives
Place of birth missing (living people)
Living people